Burka is in the northeastern district of Baghlan province. Its population is approximately 49,000. The capital is the city of Burka (alternate names: Borkeh, Barkah). It is in the foothills of the Hindu Kush mountains. The district is prone to earthquakes. On 5 May 2021 it was captured by Taliban forces.

Demographics
The district dominated by Uzbeks at 60%, followed by Tajiks with 20%. Hazaras and Pashtuns share half-half their part in the district.

References

External links
Map of Settlements United Nations, AIMS, May 2002
District profile by the UNHCR (9 April 2002)

Districts of Baghlan Province